The following is a list of countries by passenger and cargo ship exports. Data is for 2012, in millions of United States dollars, as reported by The Observatory of Economic Complexity. Currently the top twenty countries are listed.

See also
 Modern day shipbuilding 
 Shipbuilding countries list

References

External links
 Trading in Sea transport report
 Global trade in floating structures
 atlas.media.mit.edu - Observatory of Economic complexity - Countries that export Passenger and Cargo Ships (2012)

Ship
Shipbuilding